The División de Honor de Hockey Hierba is the top level of field hockey in Spain. It was founded in 1957 and is managed by the Real Federación Española de Hockey.

Teams

Number of teams by autonomous community

Champions

Titles won

By club

By autonomous community

See also
Copa del Rey de Hockey Hierba
División de Honor Femenina de Hockey Hierba

External links
 Real Federación Española de Hockey

 

 
1957 establishments in Spain
Sports leagues established in 1957
Spain